Esther is an unincorporated community in southern Alberta in Special Area No. 3, located  east of Highway 41,  north of Medicine Hat.  It was first settled in 1910.  The community has the name of Anna Esther Landreth, a girl in the neighbourhood.

References 

Localities in Special Area No. 3